was an Okinawan martial arts master who founded the Shōrin-ryū Matsumura Seito Okinawa Karate Kobudo Association.

Biography
He was born May 25, 1889 (although at least one text puts his birth year as 1891) in Nishihara, Okinawa.

He was the nephew of Nabe Matsumura (who was the grandson of Matsumura Sōkon). He began karate training at 13 under his uncle. Matsumura taught him several kata, including Naihanchi Shodan, Naihanchi Nidan, Pinan Shodan, Pinan Nidan, Passai Sho, Passai Dai, Chinto, Kusanku, Gojushiho, Sanchin, Rohai Jo, Rohai Chu, Rohai Ge, and finally at age 23, Hakutsuru. Soken has said in interviews that Kusanku is the most important kata to the style.

In 1924, Sōken emigrated to Argentina. While in Argentina, he worked as a photographer and clothes cleaner. He also taught karate to Japanese and Okinawan ex-pats in Buenos Aires.  In 1952, he returned to Okinawa and started to teach karate, first to family members. Then he opened a small dojo to the public. At first, he called the style "Matsumura Shuri-te." But in 1956, changed the name to Matsumura Seito Shōrin-ryū karate.

Hohan Sōken died on November 30, 1982 in Nishihara, Okinawa.

Students
His senior students included Seiki Arakaki, Mitsuo Inoue, Hideo Nakazato, Kohama, Kohatsu, Yonashiro  Masaya Kyan, Nishihira Kosei, Isao Toma, Yoshimatsu Akamine, Seijun Kina, Seizen Kinjo, Yuichi Kuda, Fusei Kise, Takaya Yabiku, James Coffman, Vincent C.Wiegand, Ted Lange, Rick Rose, Charles Garrett, and David Mauk.

References

Okinawan male karateka
19th-century births
1982 deaths
Shōrin-ryū practitioners